Camden County was one of the original Nineteen Counties in New South Wales and is now one of the 141 Cadastral divisions of New South Wales. It included the coastal area near Wollongong south to the Shoalhaven River, and also inland encompassing Berrima and Picton. Its western boundary was the Wollondilly River. The first settlement in the area was Camden Park, established by John Macarthur in 1806, just across the Nepean River from Cumberland County. It was the first land across the Nepean to be settled. Camden is a present-day suburb of Sydney in the same area, although parts of it are in Cumberland.

Camden County is named in honour of John Pratt, 1st Marquess Camden (1759–1840). The Electoral district of Western Division of Camden and the Electoral district of Eastern Division of Camden were the first electoral districts for the area, between 1856 and 1859.

Parishes within this county
A full list of parishes found within this county; their current LGA and mapping coordinates to the approximate centre of each location is as follows:

References

Counties of New South Wales